Margot Shumway (born August 2, 1979) is an American rower. She was born in Cincinnati, Ohio. She competed at the 2008 Summer Olympics in Beijing, where she place fifth in quadruple sculls. She competed in double sculls together with Sarah Trowbridge at the 2012 Summer Olympics in London, where they placed sixth.

References

External links

1979 births
Living people
Sportspeople from Cincinnati
American female rowers
Olympic rowers of the United States
Rowers at the 2008 Summer Olympics
Rowers at the 2012 Summer Olympics
Rowers at the 2011 Pan American Games
Pan American Games gold medalists for the United States
Pan American Games medalists in rowing
Medalists at the 2011 Pan American Games
21st-century American women